Liel may refer to:

 Karl Friedrich von Liel (1799–1863), Bavarian Major General and War Minister
 Liel Kolet (born 1989), an Israeli singer
 Liel Leibovitz (born 1976), an Israeli-American journalist
 Liel Zaguri (born 1990), an Israeli footballer